Trinidad and Tobago participated in the 2010 Summer Youth Olympics in Singapore.

The Trinidad and Tobago team consisted of 26 athletes competing in 3 sports: athletics, football and swimming.

Medalists

Athletics

Boys
Track and Road Events

Girls
Track and Road Events

Football

Girls

Group B

5th Place Match

Swimming

References

http://swimsa.org/?p=1881

External links
Competitors List: Trinidad and Tobago

Nations at the 2010 Summer Youth Olympics
2010
Summer Youth Olympics